The Bermondsey Kid is a 1933 British drama film directed by Ralph Dawson and starring Esmond Knight, Pat Peterson, Ellis Irving and Ernest Sefton. A newsboy enters a boxing championship where he is matched with a sick friend.

Cast
 Esmond Knight as Eddie Martin
 Ellis Irving as Joe Dougherty
 Pat Peterson as Mary
 Ernest Sefton as Lou Rodman
 Clifford McLaglen as Bates
 Eve Gray as Toots
 Syd Crossley as Porky
 Winifred Oughton as Mrs Bodge
 Len Harvey as himself
 Henry Mason as himself
 Val Guest as minor role

References

External links

1933 films
1933 drama films
British drama films
British black-and-white films
1930s English-language films
1930s British films